The Men's Downhill competition of the Lillehammer 1994 Olympics was held at Kvitfjell on Sunday, 13 February.

The reigning world champion was Urs Lehmann and the reigning Olympic champion was Patrick Ortlieb; Franz Heinzer was the defending World Cup downhill champion and Marc Girardelli led the current season.

Tommy Moe, an American of Norwegian ancestry, edged out Kjetil André Aamodt of Norway by 0.04 seconds to take the gold medal in the downhill. Ed Podivinsky of Canada was the bronze medalist, just 0.12 seconds behind Moe. Ortlieb was fourth, Girardelli fifth, Alphand eighth, and Heinzer did not finish.

The defending champion was in the field for the first time since 1976, when  1972 champion Bernhard Russi won the silver medal. Ortlieb was just off the podium in 1994, which remains the second-best result by a defending champion.  Prior to Russi, only two champions had been in the field to defend, but neither made the top ten: Henri Oreiller was 14th in 1952 and Egon Zimmermann finished 13th in 1968.

Results
The race was started at 11:00 local time, (UTC +1).

References

External links
FIS results

Men's downhill
Winter Olympics